Szabolcs Udvari (26 July 1974 – 26 September 2020) was a Hungarian footballer who played for Kaposvölgye VSC as defender.

References

Sources
Futballévkönyv 2003, I. kötet, 104–109. o., Aréna 2000 kiadó, Budapest, 2004 ISSN 1585-2172 
Profile on hlsz.hu

1974 births
2020 deaths
Association football defenders
Békéscsaba 1912 Előre footballers
Place of death missing
Sportspeople from Szeged
Hungarian footballers